The flag of Bago Region depicts two golden hamsas, female one sitting on the male's back, on a white circle bordered by green charged at the centre of blue background. The name "Bago Region" is written in Burmese above the birds.

Symbolism 
According to local legend, the city of Bago was established on the location where a male hamsa landed on a single rock above the floodwaters and let the female stand on his back, during a massive flood, hence the adoption of that couple on the flag and seal of Bago.

Former flag 
The former flag of Bago Region, adopted in 1974, depicts a hamsa on a blue background. "Bago Division", the former name of Bago Region, is written in Burmese underneath the bird. After renaming of Myanmar administrative divisions in 2010, the name on the flag also changed accordingly — the word "big region" was added to become "Bago Region". Around 2018, a new design, which replaces the single golden hamsa with two golden hamsas on a green-bordered white circle, started to appear in sport tournaments.

The former flag of Mon State is similar to the pre-2018 flag of Bago Region, but its hamsa and text have different proportions and designs.

References 

Flag
Flags of Myanmar
Flags displaying animals